A jack of plate is a type of armour made up of small iron plates sewn between layers of felt and canvas.  They were commonly referred to simply as a "jack" (although this could also refer to any outer garment). This type of armour was used by common Medieval European soldiers as well as by the rebel peasants known as Jacquerie.  The present day equivalent is perhaps a bullet-proof vest.

The jack is similar to the brigandine. The main difference is in the method of construction: a brigandine is riveted whereas a jack is sewn. Jacks of plate were created by stitching as many as 1000 small overlapping squares of iron between two canvases. They also offered a tactical advantage: they allowed soldiers to rest the butts of weapons firmly against their shoulders, which wasn't feasible with smooth-surfaced plate armours. Unlike plate they made no attempt to be bulletproof. Jacks were often made from recycled pieces of older plate armor, including damaged brigandines and cuirasses cut into small squares.

The jack was particularly favoured in Scotland. After the death of James V of Scotland in December 1542, Cardinal Beaton ordered the keeper of the royal wardrobe John Tennent to give the king's jack of plate to his lawyer Adam Otterburn. In July 1547, Regent Arran had a new jack covered with purple taffeta, then changed his mind, choosing purple velvet. During the rebellion against Mary, Queen of Scots known as the Chaseabout Raid it was said in September 1565 that while her husband Lord Darnley wore a gilt corslet or breastplate, the rest of the lords "after their country fashion" wore jacks.

Jacks remained in use as late as the 16th century and were often worn by Scottish Border Reivers. Although they were obsolete in Britain by the time of the English Civil War many were taken to the New World by the Pilgrim Fathers as they provided excellent protection from Native American arrows; one dating back to 1607 was found at Jamestown in 2005.

References 

Medieval armour
Body armor
Western plate armour